Parr's Priory Rowing Club is a rowing club in the east extreme of Barnes, London, close to Putney. The club was formed in about 2000 and is between Putney and Hammersmith Bridges. Opposite it on the river is Craven Cottage, the home of Fulham F.C.  Its boathouse is shared with Barn Elms Rowing Club.

Membership
Membership is relatively small, out of the 20 Tideway non-educational establishment rowing clubs.  The club is happy to take on complete novices to the sport at certain times of the year.

Official name
The CASC (community amateur sports club) as which the club files its charity/tax returns is Aldebaran Club  Parr's Priory Rowing Club.

Honours

British junior championships

See also
Rowing on the River Thames

References

External links
 https://www.parrspriory.org.uk/ club's website

Tideway Rowing clubs
Sport in the London Borough of Richmond upon Thames
Rowing clubs of the River Thames